Kheyrabad-e Seyf Laleh (also Romanized as Kheyrābād-e Seyf Laleh; also known as Kheyrābād, Kheyrābād-e Bālā, and Kheyrābād-e ‘Olyā) is a village in Lishtar Rural District, in the Central District of Gachsaran County, Kohgiluyeh and Boyer-Ahmad Province, Iran. At the 2006 census, its population was 42, in 9 families.

References 

Populated places in Gachsaran County